Off Jackson Avenue is a 2008 American crime thriller drama film written by, directed by and starring John-Luke Montias.

Cast
Jessica Pimentel as Olivia
Stivi Paskoski as Milot
Jun Suenaga as Tomo
Aya Cash as Olga
Gene Ruffini as Uncle Jack
John-Luke Montias as Joey
Clem Cheung as Eddie Chang
Daniel Oreskes as Ivan
Judith Hawking as Donna
Jim Tooey as Russ
Michael Gnat as Wall Street Jimmy

Release
The film was released at the Quad Cinema in New York City on July 17, 2009.

Reception
The film has a 59% rating on Rotten Tomatoes based on 17 reviews.

Ronnie Scheib of Variety gave the film a positive review and wrote, "its laid-back absurdist tone and no-nonsense pacing make for an audio-visual delight."

Andrew Schenker of Slant Magazine awarded the film one and a half stars out of four and wrote, "Sex slavery, Japanese hit men, and ordinary car thieves converge on the mean streets of Long Island City in Off Jackson Avenue, John-Luke Montias's engagingly lurid but ultimately tepid crime drama."

References

External links
 
 

American crime thriller films
2000s American films